Chorąży of Inowłódz was an honorary office in a land in the Polish–Lithuanian Commonwealth. It was created in 1726.

Clerical hierarchy for a powiat of Inowłódz was created in 1726. Scholars considers that in a reality it was an addition for a relict castellany of Inowłódz.

In 1793 the voivodeship of Łęczyca with the powiat of Inowłódz was annexed by Prussia. With this fact a clerical hierarchy, including a chorąży of Inowłódz, in the powiat of Inowłódz disappeared.

List of chorąży of Inowłódz

Footnotes

References 

Government officials of the Polish–Lithuanian Commonwealth